Maria Anna Klein-Schmeink (born 6 January 1958) is a German politician of Alliance 90/The Greens who has been serving as a member of the Bundestag from the state of North Rhine-Westphalia since 2009.

Early life and career 
Klein-Schmeink studied sociology at the University of Münster from 1977 to 1984 and graduated with a master's degree. While still a student, she began working as a volunteer for the Sozialpädagogisches Bildungswerk Münster (Sobi).

After completing her studies until 2002, Klein-Schmeink worked full-time in a leading position for the Sobi. From 1986 to 1988 she was involved in the establishment of the institution "cultur- und begegnungszentrum achtermannstraße" (c.u.b.a.).  From 2002 until she moved to the German Bundestag in 2009, she worked as a legislative advisor to the Green Party's group in the State Parliament of North Rhine-Westphalia.

Political career 
In parliament, Klein-Schmeink is a member of the Committee on Health. Since 2014 she has been serving as her parliamentary group's spokesperson on health policy. In 2020, she succeeded Katja Dörner as one her parliamentary group's deputy chairs, under the leadership of co-chairs Katrin Göring-Eckardt and Anton Hofreiter.

In addition to her committee assignments, Klein-Schmeink is part of the German-Austrian Parliamentary Friendship Group.

In the negotiations to form a so-called traffic light coalition of the Social Democrats (SPD), the Green Party and the FDP following the 2021 federal elections, Klein-Schmeink led her party's delegation in the working group on health policy; her co-chairs from the other parties were Katja Pähle and Christine Aschenberg-Dugnus.

In the negotiations to form a coalition government under the leadership of Minister-President of North Rhine-Westphalia Hendrik Wüst following the 2022 state elections, Klein-Schmeink was part of her party’s delegation.

References

External links 

  
 Bundestag biography 
 

1958 births
Living people
Members of the Bundestag for North Rhine-Westphalia
Female members of the Bundestag
21st-century German women politicians
Members of the Bundestag 2021–2025
Members of the Bundestag 2017–2021
Members of the Bundestag 2013–2017
Members of the Bundestag 2009–2013
Members of the Bundestag for Alliance 90/The Greens